Argagnon is a commune in the Pyrénées-Atlantiques department in the Nouvelle-Aquitaine region of south-western France.

The inhabitants of the commune are known as Argagnonais or Argagnonaises

Geography

Argagnon is located some 7 km south-east of Orthez and 2 km north-west of Maslacq. Access to the commune is by the D817 road from Orthez which passes through the village and continues south-east to Artix. The D275 from Maslacq to Arthez-de-Béarn passes through the eastern part of the commune. The Toulouse-Bayonne railway passes through the south of the commune parallel to the D817 but there is no station in the commune. The nearest stations are at Orthez to the north-west and Lacq to the south-east. The commune consists mostly of farmland however there are forests in the east and north of the commune.

The commune lies in the Drainage basin of the Adour and the Gave de Pau flows through the south-western edge of the commune with the Ruisseau de Clamonde flowing into it from the commune. Paul Raymond mentioned in 1863 that the Juren, a stream with its source in Arthez-de-Béarn, crossed Aragnon and flowed into the Gave de Pau

Places and Hamlets

 Arramoun
 Arrigran
 Arriscle
 Arvélé
 Audios
 Baraten
 Bataille
 Bernès
 Bouhaben
 Cazenave
 Cazot
 Château Champetier
 Chou
 Claverie
 Clerc
 Soum de Coste
 Daubagna
 Guillemet
 Houndière
 Jouanbayle
 Lacamuse
 Lachourute
 Lahoueillâde
 Larréc
 Larrus
 Lassègue
 Lasserre
 Lescloupé
 Lirou
 Louncouat
 Lourtas
 Lourteigt
 Marcerin
 Marchand
 Marquittou
 Maysonnave
 Mirabel
 Momas
 Mouillade
 Moullié
 Nicot
 Pédauque
 Pehau
 Pierre Grand
 Poumé
 Pradot
 Puyôo
 Roc
 Sabaté
 Sarraillot
 Sauvajunte
 Tisné

Neighbouring communes and villages

Toponymy
Its name in Béarnais is Arganhon. Brigitte Jobbé-Duval indicated that the name Argagnon originated from the first owner, Arcanius, and was expanded with the suffix -onem giving the meaning "Domain of Arcanius".

The following table details the origins of the commune name and other names in the commune.

Sources:
Raymond: Topographic Dictionary of the Department of Basses-Pyrenees, 1863, on the page numbers indicated in the table. 
Ldh/EHESS/Cassini: 

Origins:
Bigorre: Cartulary of Bigorre
Military: Military Inspection of Béarn
Census: Census of Béarn
Reformation: Reformation of Béarn
Marcerin: The Terrier of Marcerin.
Pardies: Notaries of Pardies

History
In 1385 Argagnon and Marcerin depended on the bailiwick of Pau. Argagnon at that time had 9 fires and Marcerin had 12.

The Lords of Argagnon were the Castera family

Argagnon until 1846 was part of the Canton of Lagor. The commune merged with Marcerin on 8 April 1851 to form the commune of Argagnon-Marcerin.

During the German occupation from 1940-1944 it was one of the official check points for the Demarcation line.

Administration

List of Successive Mayors

Georges Vandesande sponsored the candidacy of Jacques Cheminade in the presidential election of 1995.

Inter-communality
Argagnon belongs to five inter-communal structures:
 the Communauté de communes de Lacq-Orthez;
 the AEP association of Gave and Baïse;
 the energy association of Pyrénées-Atlantiques;
 the inter-communal association of Arthez-de-Béarn;
 the inter-communal association of defence against floods from the Gave de Pau.

Demography
In 2017 the commune had 702 inhabitants.

Economy
The town is part of the Appellation d'origine contrôlée (AOC) zone designation of Ossau-iraty.

Culture and Heritage

Nickname and saying
According to Hubert Dutech, the inhabitants of Marcerin were called perautucs, meaning "fools". He also cited the saying A Marcerin, n'i a glèisa ni mouli, mes que i a ua houratèra, oun lou diable apèra, which means "In Marcerin there is neither church nor mill, but there is a small cave where the devil calls".

Civil heritage
Several Prehistoric camps have been found in the commune, reflecting its ancient past. The most important of them is the Turoû de Dous Garos at 90 metres altitude. Ditches surround it and there are three earthen ramparts. Remains from the Iron Age have been discovered. The park of the current chateau is located in the former castéra.

Religious heritage
The Church of Saint-Pierre (11th century) is registered as an historical monument. It was built in 1866 on remains from the 11th century.

Facilities
Argagnon has a primary school.

Notable people linked to the commune
Raymond Larrabure, born in 1797 in Saint-Jean-Pied-de-Port and died in 1875 in Argagnon, was a French politician.
Henry de Pène, born in 1830 in Paris and died in 1888 in the same city, was a French writer and journalist. Henry de Pène was also called Henry de Pène of Argagnon - after the castle owned by his father at Argagnon.
Robert Sarrabère, born in 1926 in Argagnon was a French Catholic bishop of Aire and Dax until his retirement in 2002. From 9 January to 2 September 2007, he served the diocese of Montauban as Apostolic Administrator during the period of transition from one bishop to another.

See also
Communes of the Pyrénées-Atlantiques department

References

External links
 Page on Argagnon on the Community of communes of Arthez-de-Béarn website 
Argagnon on Géoportail, National Geographic Institute (IGN) website 
Argagnon on the 1750 Cassini Map

Communes of Pyrénées-Atlantiques